Lists of The Simpsons publications include:
 List of The Simpsons books, a list of books related to The Simpsons
 List of The Simpsons comics, a list of comics related to The Simpsons
  Simpsons Illustrated, a magazine about The Simpsons

See also
 Bibliography of works on The Simpsons

Publications